Pholidopleuriformes is an extinct order of ray-finned fish.

Classification
 Family †Pholidopleuridae Abel 1919/Wade 1932
 Genus †Gracilignathichthys Bürgin 1992
 †Gracilignathichthys microlepis Bürgin 1992
 Genus †Arctosomus Berg 1941 [Neavichthys Whitley 1951]
 †Arctosomus sibiricus Berg 1941
 Genus †Macroaethes Wade 1932
 †M. alta Wade 1935
 †M. brookvalei Wade 1932
 Genus †Pholidopleurus Bronn 1858
 †P. ticinensis Bürgin 1992
 †P. xiaowaensis Liu & Yin 2006
 †P. typus Bronn 1858

Timeline of genera

Bibliography
 
 Tree of Actinopterygii

References

 
Triassic bony fish
Prehistoric ray-finned fish orders